The People's Movement of Serbs from Kosovo and Metohija "Fatherland", commonly known as the Fatherland, is a political organization in Serbia and Kosovo that represents the Serbian minority in Kosovo. It is led by the former Mayor of Zubin Potok, and a prominent figure in the Kosovo Serb community, Slaviša Ristić.

The organization has heavily criticized the Serb List, and it claims that Kosovo is an integral part of Serbia.

History 
"Fatherland" was founded on 19 January 2017 in North Mitrovica by the former Autonomous Province of Kosovo and Metohija board members of the Democratic Party, Serbian Progressive Party, and the Socialist Party of Serbia. The first president of the organization was Aleksandar Vasić. In 2018, Slaviša Ristic was selected as the president.

Since 2018, the organization has been a part of the Alliance for Serbia, a major opposition alliance in Serbia. The organization has criticized the Serb List for participating in the Kosovan elections, and for joining the Government of Kosovo. The organization boycotted the 2019 Kosovan parliamentary elections as it claims that participating in the Kosovan elections violates the constitution of Serbia, and it called for the boycott of the 2020 Serbian parliamentary elections.

"Fatherland" is endorsing presidential candidate Zdravko Ponoš and the United Serbia (Ujedinjena Srbija, US) coalition in the 2022 Serbian general election.

Electoral performance

Parliamentary elections

Assembly of Kosovo

Notes

References 

Political parties established in 2017
Conservative parties in Serbia
Serb political parties in Kosovo
Right-wing parties in Europe
National conservative parties
Nationalist parties in Serbia